Dam Street is a 2005 Chinese film directed by Li Yu. Dam Street is Li's second feature film, after 2001's Fish and Elephant and was produced by screenwriter Fang Li's Laurel Films and Sylvain Bursztejn's French company, Rosem Films.

Dam Street, shot mainly in Sichuanese Mandarin, follows the life of a young woman, Xiaoyun in a corner of China's central Sichuan province. The film premiered at the 2005 Venice Film Festival on September 8, and also received a handful of other showings at other festivals, notably Toronto (2005) and Deauville (2006).

Lead actress Liu Yi is a notable Sichuan opera actress (Plum Blossom Award, 2007).

Story 
Dam Street tells the story of Xiaoyun, a sixteen-year-old girl in Sichuan who discovers that she has become pregnant, shocking her family and community. When the school discovers the scandal, Xiaoyun and her boyfriend, Wang Feng are expelled, with Wang Feng being sent to a vocational school in another city. Xiaoyun, meanwhile, is screamed at by her mother, a teacher at the high school, and her boyfriend's elder sister Wang Zhengyue, a nurse who also helps deliver her child.

Together, the mother and sister lie to Xiaoyun, claiming the child died in birth, while actually arranging for his adoption across the river. Ten years later, Xiaoyun's life is at a standstill in the same small town. She makes a meager living as a singer in a local troupe but otherwise has never left. Eventually she strikes up a friendship with a ten-year-old boy, Xiao Yong who becomes her closest confidante and defender in the community that scorns her.

Cast 
Liu Yi as Liu Xiaoyun, the film's heroine, a young girl who due to an unforeseen pregnancy sees her life go off-track.
Huang Xingrao as Xiao Yong, a ten-year-old boy who befriends Xiaoyun.
Li Kechun as Su Yunwen, Xiaoyun's mother, a teacher at the school.
Liu Rui as Wang Feng, Xiaoyun's high school boyfriend.
Wang Yizhu as Wang Zhengyue, Wang Feng's elder sister, a nurse.

Reception 
The film, the second by mainland helmer Li Yu, was shown to only a handful of audiences, though it did receive a limited screening in New York, 2007, two years after its premiere in Venice. Critics like Derek Elley of Variety placed the film in the same vein of other European-inspired Chinese films such as Wang Chao's Day and Night and Wang Xiaoshuai's Shanghai Dreams (the latter of which takes place in roughly the same time period of the 1980s); a movement highlighted by muted emotional palettes. At the same time, however, Elley found that the muted emotion went too far, resulting in a film that lacked "dramatic heft."

Manohla Dargis of The New York Times reviewed the film when it was part of the Museum of Modern Art's Global Lens 2007 series. She noted primarily the film's grim outlook on post-Mao alienation, though she also paid special attention to the film's unique comments on sexual politics.

Awards and nominations
 Venice Film Festival, 2005
 C.I.C.A.E. Award
 Flanders International Film Festival, 2005
 Best Director, Li Yu
 Golden Rooster Awards, 2005
 Best Supporting Actress, Li Kechun (nominated)
 Deauville Asian Film Festival, 2006
 Lotus du Meilleur Film

References

External links 
 
 
 
 Dam Street from the Global Film Initiative
 A review of Dam Street from Celluloid Notes

2005 films
2005 drama films
Films set in Sichuan
Teenage pregnancy in film
Films directed by Li Yu
Chinese drama films
Films set in the 1980s
Films set in the 1990s
Films shot in Sichuan
Films about mother–son relationships